Aegyrcitherium is an extinct genus of prehistoric rhinoceros endemic to Europe during the Miocene living from 16.9—16 mya existing for approximately .

Taxonomy
Aegyrcitherium was named by Antoine (1997), who assigned one species to the genus, A. beonensis. It was reranked as Hispanotherium (Aegyrcitherium) by Guérin and Pickford (2003). It was assigned to Elasmotheriini by Antoine et al. (2000) and Deng (2003); and to Hispanotherium by Guérin and Pickford (2003).

References

Pliocene rhinoceroses
Pleistocene genus extinctions
Piacenzian first appearances
Pleistocene rhinoceroses